Polana may refer to the following places:

Places
Polana, Lower Silesian Voivodeship (south-west Poland)
Polana, Subcarpathian Voivodeship (south-east Poland)
Polana, Opole Voivodeship (south-west Poland)
Polana, Pomeranian Voivodeship (north Poland)
Polana, Ukraine, village in Khmelnytskyi Raion, Khmelnytskyi Oblast
Polana, Murska Sobota, village in Slovenia

Other
 Poľana, a mountain range in central Slovakia or a hill in this range with same name
 142 Polana, an asteroid, namesake of the Polana subgroup in the Nysa family
 Polana, a genus of leafhoppers

See also